March for Jesus is an annual interdenominational event in which Christians march through towns and cities.

History 
 

The March for Jesus began as a City March in London, United Kingdom, in 1987. It emerged from the friendship of three church groups: Pioneer, led by Gerald Coates; Ichthus led by Roger Forster; and Youth with a Mission led by Lynn Green. Together with the worship leader Graham Kendrick, they led a movement which over the next three years spread across the UK, Europe and North America, and finally across the world. Hundreds of smaller marches emerged in its wake.

The initial expectation of 5,000 people was largely surpassed by the presence of 15,000 participants, boosting the realization of an edition of the event.

By 1990, the March had already spread across 49 cities across the UK and also in Belfast (the capital of Northern Ireland), where 6,000 Catholics and Protestants gathered. It was estimated that approximately 200,000 religious participated in the event. The March quickly expanded to the other continents.

The march was established in several countries of the world, especially in France in 1991, in the United States in 1992  and in Brazil in 1993, where it gathered 3 million people in São Paulo in 2019, one of the largest Christian gatherings in the world.

By country

Brazil

In order to gather faithful from various Christian denominations, the March for Jesus is organized by the Church Reborn in Christ, Brazil (with the participation of other Neo-Pentecostal groups), the event brings to the street the churches, which march behind electric trios. With the participation of several states of Brazil, caravans (name designated to groups of travelers, pilgrims) from various places gather. Between 1994 and 2000 it was held as a global event, taking place in about 170 countries on the same date. The caravans meet at a certain point and go "marching" to the place where a stage is located for eventual shows, as occurred in São Paulo on May 31, 2018, In the year 2019, the event will take place on June 20, 2019; With departure 10 hours from the light meter and a day when thousands of faithful gathered in the Region of Light and went to the Heroes' Square, located near the Field of Mars, where the stage was set up.

In 1993, the March For Jesus arrived in Brazil through the Apostle Estevam Hernandes, one of the founders of the Church Reborn in Christ. This year, the March For Jesus was held in more than 100 cities in various regions of Brazil. Six years later, about 10 million people from approximately 200 countries marched to celebrate the name of Jesus Christ. People of various religions, ages and ethnicities took to the streets of countries such as England, France, Germany, Italy, Northern Ireland, Egypt, Israel, USA, Canada, Russia, Cuba, Finland, Japan, Mozambique, South Africa, Brazil, Argentina, Bolivia, Peru and Chile. In 2013, the event was held for the first time in the Holy Land, Israel. The March for Jesus has been part of Brazil's official calendar since September 2009, when Federal Law 12,025 was sanctioned by Former President Luiz Inácio Lula da Silva. In 2015, the event was attended by approximately 340,000 people.

São Paulo 

The first Brazilian edition of the March for Jesus, held in the city of São Paulo in 1993, took about 350,000 people to the streets of the citycenter, bound for the Anhangabaú Valley, taking place a gospel show and collection of clothing. Since then, the event has been transferred to some regions of the city, most of them located in the North Zone of São Paulo. Gathering crowds every year, reaches the milestone of 1 million evangelicals participating in the year 2000. In 2005 the March was transferred to Paulista Avenue, where it was held for another year. In 2007, after a term signed between the Public Prosecutor's Office of São Paulo and the government of Mayor Gilberto Kassab (DEM), there was a restriction on the holding of events on the Avenue, which, from this date, would host only three events per year.

From this year the March began to be held in the neighborhoods of Bom Retiro and Santana, gathering more than three million participants annually. The march path begins in the central region of the city, at tiradentes subway station, follows Tiradentes Avenue, Ponte das Bandeiras, Avenida Santos Dumont, Campo de Bagatelle Square, and ends at Praça Heróis da FEB, Zona Norte. After the walk, accompanied by more than 10 electric trios, the participants gather at the concentration of the event, a stage set up in the Heroes Square of FEB, where gospel music shows are held. In 2008, Gilberto Kassab, mayor of the city, said the city was studying the possibility of transferring the event to the Interlagos Racetrack, where the 2009 edition would be. The decision, made due to complaints from the population living in the Campo de Bagatelle Square region, caused the discontent of the members of the Reborn in Christ Church, organizer of the March in the city of São Paulo. Thus, in 2010, the 18th March for Jesus took place in the North Zone of the city.

The faithful met at tiradentes subway station, located on Line 1-Azul, and traveled 4 km until they reached the final point: Campo de Bagatelle Squarein Santana. There, the more than 2 million participants were able to accompany musical performances by French singer Chris Durán, and artists such as Soraya Moraes, Renascer Praise, DJ Alpiste, FLG Quartet, Touch the Altar and Brother Lazarus. The Military Police (PM) said that 2 million people participated in the event. In the following editions, the site was maintained. In 2011, the PM confirmed 1.5 million participants in the March for Jesus, a number that fell to 335,000 in 2012, according to a survey conducted by the newspaper Folha de S. Paulo. In the following years, the number of participants became unstable — according to the Military Police, 800,000 people participated in 2013 and 200,000 in 2014; in 2015, the PM counted 340,000, but in 2016 did not disclose the number of participants and the organization of the event estimated that 3 million people attended to walk the path of approximately four kilometers. In 2017 is scheduled for the fifteenth of June, the holiday of corpus christi, the Christian event. The event has free admission. In the light subway station, outside, the participants meet, so that they can walk together to the end of the March for Jesus, in heroes square feb. The event will start at ten o'clock in the morning. The organization of the event advises people not to stand at the subway door, so as to avoid inconvenience in the entry and exit of people at the station, and that adults who are accompanied by children, identify them, with the name and telephone number of the person responsible, and their respective name. The 2017 edition celebrates twenty-five years of March to Jesus and will have several attractions in the Heroes Square of FEB. Among them the bands "Ao Cubo", "Banda Dopa", "Bruna Karla", "Damares", "Eli Soares", "Fernando Urias", "Marcela Tais", "Juliana Santiago", Milena and Xuxu", Nanan Shara and PR Brinco", among other attractions. Since 1993, the March for Jesus has been held annually in hundreds of cities in all states of Brazil, including the Federal District.

Further reading
Graham Kendrick, Gerald Coates, Roger Forster and Lynne Green with Catherine Butcher, March for Jesus (Eastbourne: Kingsway, 1992)
Graham Kendrick Public Praise (Altamonte Springs: Creation House, 1992)

External links

 March for Jesus - USA
 March for Jesus - Canada
 March for Jesus - France
 March for Jesus - Brazil
 March for Jesus - UK

References

History of Christianity in the United Kingdom
Christian organizations established in 1983
Evangelical Christian missions
Christian processions
Parades
1983 establishments in Australia